Zlobino is a rural locality (a village) in Butylitskoye Rural Settlement, Melenkovsky District, Vladimir Oblast, Russia. The population was 635 as of 2010. There are 2 streets.

Geography 
Zlobino is located on the Unzha River, 11 km north of Melenki (the district's administrative centre) by road. Arkhangel is the nearest rural locality.

References 

Rural localities in Melenkovsky District
Melenkovsky Uyezd